Kevin James Landrigan (18 January 1917 – 3 December 1982) was an Australian rules footballer who played with Hawthorn in the Victorian Football League (VFL).

Family
The son of James Michael Landrigan (1885-1922), and Elizabeth Maria Landrigan (1881-1966), née Hogan, Kevin James Landrigan was born at Rainbow, Victoria on 18 January 1917.

He married Hazel Elizabeth Laragy on 18 June 1945.

Football
Cleared to Hawthorn from the Hopetoun Football Club in the Southern Mallee Football League on 5 June 1940, he played only one First XVIII game, against Fitzroy, in the last home-and-away game of the 1940 season.

Notes

References
 World War Two Service Record Lieutenant Kevin James Landrigan (VX139190 (V25617)), Department of Veterans' Affairs.

External links 

1917 births
1982 deaths
Australian rules footballers from Victoria (Australia)
Hawthorn Football Club players
Australian Army personnel of World War II
Australian Army officers
Military personnel from Victoria (Australia)